The Leake County School District is a public school district based in Carthage, Mississippi (USA). The district's boundaries parallel that of Leake County.

Schools
Leake Central High School (Grades 9-12)
Leake County High School (Grades 7-12)
Leake Central Junior High School (Grades 6-8)
Leake County Elementary School (Grades K-6)
Leake Central Elementary School (Grades K-5)
Leake County Career & Technical Center

Demographics

2006-07 school year
There were a total of 3,326 students enrolled in the Leake County School District during the 2006–2007 school year. The gender makeup of the district was 47% female and 53% male. The racial makeup of the district was 57.76% African American, 37.43% White, 3.19% Hispanic, 1.08% Native American, and 0.54% Asian. 64.2% of the district's students were eligible to receive free lunch.

Previous school years

Accountability statistics

See also
List of school districts in Mississippi

References

External links
 

Education in Leake County, Mississippi
School districts in Mississippi